Nejc Kolman (born 26 February 1989) is a professional football player from Slovenia who plays for Heidelberg United FC. Playing professional football in Europe for 5 years, he also represented his country Slovenia, playing for youth national team of Slovenia (14 appearances, one goal) and played in qualifications for the European Championship. He has also five years older brother Saša Kolman who is former football player and now football manager in Australia.

References

External links
PrvaLiga profile 

1989 births
Living people
Slovenian footballers
Association football midfielders
ND Gorica players
Slovenian PrvaLiga players
NK Nafta Lendava players
NK Primorje players
Slovenian expatriate footballers
Slovenian expatriate sportspeople in Spain
Expatriate footballers in Spain
Slovenian expatriate sportspeople in Bulgaria
Expatriate footballers in Bulgaria
NK Celje players
People from Šempeter pri Gorici